Ace Von Johnson is an American musician who was the lead guitarist in the glam metal band Faster Pussycat and currently rhythm guitarist for L.A. Guns.

Johnson was previously a member of punk and metal bands such as Cheap Sex, Madcap, the U.S. Bombs, the Generators, Unwritten Law and Murphy's Law.

Career
In 2010, he performed on an alternative version of the song "Hollywood Tonight" for the posthumous Michael Jackson album "Michael". The track was produced by Jackson collaborator Ron "Neff-U" Feemster, but was ultimately not released.

Annually since 2012, he has performed with Faster Pussycat on the Monsters of Rock cruise. Two such cruises sailed in 2016 and one each in 2017 and 2018, with Faster Pussycat performing on each, making them the only band to appear on every MoR cruise to this point.

In May 2015, he appeared alongside two of his Faster Pussycat bandmates on VH1 Classic's That Metal Show in the "Stump The Trunk" segment. In August 2015, he performed at Riki Rachtman's's Cathouse Live, a festival that reunited many of the bands from the Cathouse nightclub's heyday, held at Irving Meadows Amphitheater in Irvine, CA. Later in the year, he served as musical director at the Rock and Shock horror and music festival in Worcester, Massachusetts.

Since its inception in January 2015, he has been a regular featured performer at Ultimate Jam Night, a weekly music showcase first held at Lucky Strike Live before moving to the Whisky a Go Go, both in Hollywood, CA.

References

External links 
 
 

Faster Pussycat members
L.A. Guns members
American punk rock guitarists
American heavy metal guitarists
Living people
Year of birth missing (living people)
Place of birth missing (living people)
American male guitarists
Vixen (band) members
Unwritten Law members